Tsinghua Shenzhen International Graduate School (Tsinghua SIGS) is a public university established by Tsinghua University and the Shenzhen Municipal Government as a joint venture in 2001. It is located in the University Town of Shenzhen, surrounded by Peking University Shenzhen Graduate School and the Harbin Institute of Technology Shenzhen.

History

Graduate School in Shenzhen, Tsinghua University 
In 2001, Tsinghua University and the Shenzhen Municipal Government established the Graduate School in Shenzhen as a joint venture in education. The school created seven academic divisions: Life Science & Health; Energy & Environment; Information Science & Technology; Logistics & Transportation; Advanced Manufacturing; Ocean Science & Technology; and Social Science & Management to carry out graduate education and scientific research.

In 2014, Tsinghua University and the University of California, Berkeley (UC Berkeley) established Tsinghua-Berkeley Shenzhen Institute (TBSI). The joint research institute brings faculty from Tsinghua University and UC Berkeley to fulfil the aims of being a world-class research and education institute.

It was formerly called the Graduate School at Shenzhen (GSST) until March 2019.

Tsinghua Shenzhen International Graduate School (Tsinghua SIGS) 
In March 2019, Tsinghua Shenzhen International Graduate School relaunched as a further expansion and integration of the Graduate School at Shenzhen (GSST) and the Tsinghua-Berkeley Shenzhen Institute (TBSI). It aims to create an academic and research environment that is international, borderless and entrepreneurial.

Campus 
Tsinghua SIGS' campus is located in Nanshan District, Shenzhen within the University Town of Shenzhen. The campus continues to expand, and will occupy a total area of over 50 hectares after construction.

Academics 
Tsinghua SIGS provides master and doctoral degree programs under seven interdisciplinary theme areas including Energy & Materials, Data Science & Information Technology, Biopharmaceutical and Health Engineering, Marine Engineering & Technology, Future Human Habitats, Environment & Ecology and Innovation Management.  

It currently offers 25 Master's Programs and 17 Doctoral Programs.

International Partnerships

Academic exchange and joint degree programs 
Tsinghua SIGS conducts interdisciplinary research, academic exchange and joint degree programs with renowned universities including UC Berkeley, RWTH Aachen University, Kyoto University, Nagoya University, Waseda University, Center for Research and Interdisciplinary (CRI, Paris), Université Paris Descartes, Université Paris Diderot and University of Melbourne.

Research

Shenzhen Geim Graphene Research Center

In December 2017, the Shenzhen Geim Graphene Research Center, jointly established by Tsinghua University and the Shenzhen Municipal Government, officially opened. The center is managed by the Shenzhen Science and Technology Innovation Committee, and supported by Tsinghua-Berkeley Shenzhen Institute (TBSI) and Tsinghua SIGS. Under the leadership of Professor Andre Geim, 2010 Nobel Prize winner in physics and one of graphene discoverers, the research center focuses on two-dimensional materials and graphene research.

RISC-V International Open Source Laboratory

In November 2019, the RISC-V International Open Source Laboratory (RIOS Lab) officially unveiled. Under the leadership of 2017 A.M. Turing Award winner Dr. David Patterson, and operational support from TBSI,  RIOS Lab mainly conducts research in RISC-V hardware and software technology.

See also
Tsinghua-Berkeley Shenzhen Institute
Tsinghua University

External Links
Tsinghua Shenzhen International Graduate School
Tsinghua Shenzhen International Graduate School  
Tsinghua-Berkeley Shenzhen Institute
Tsinghua University

References

Tsinghua University
Nanshan District, Shenzhen
Universities and colleges in Shenzhen
Educational institutions established in 2001
2001 establishments in China